Telkom-3S is an Indonesian geostationary communications satellite built as a replacement of Telkom-3 that was lost due to a launch failure on 6 August 2012. Telkom-3S was successfully launched in 14 February 2017, at 21:39 UTC and commissioned into service on 17 April 2017.

Satellite description 
Telkom-3S is fitted with 24 C-Band transponders, 8 extended C-Band transponders and 10 Ku-Band transponders. The C-band payload will cover Indonesia and Southeast Asia, while the extended C-band payload will cover both Indonesia and part of Malaysia. The Ku-band payload will specifically cover Indonesia. Telkom-3S will provide high-definition television (HDTV) services along with mobile communications and internet applications.

References 

Spacecraft launched in 2017
Communications satellites
Communications in Indonesia
Satellites of Indonesia
2017 in Indonesia